The iyokan (伊予柑 - Citrus × iyo), also known as anadomikan (穴門みかん) and Gokaku no Iyokan, is a Japanese citrus fruit, similar in appearance to a mandarin orange, arising from a cross between the Dancy tangerine and another mandarin variety, the kaikoukan. It is the second most widely produced citrus fruit in Japan after the satsuma mandarin.

Iyokan was discovered in  Yamaguchi Prefecture during the Meiji era. Nowadays it mostly grows in Ehime Prefecture. Iyokan are named after Ehime Prefecture which was once called "Iyo-no-kuni" (literal meaning: Iyo Country).

Description
The peel is thicker than that of a mikan, but it can be peeled by hand. The skin is very shiny and brightly colored and, once peeled, the flesh gives off a very strong scent. The flesh is slightly sour and more bitter than an orange, but sweeter than a grapefruit.

There is a variation grown into a pentagon shape to promote good luck and to revive the popularity of the fruit, also giving it another nickname, Gokaku no Iyokan, which translates into "Pentagonal Iyokan" It is sometimes placed into fish feed to mask the fishy flavor.

In Japan, the citrus can be seen during springtime as a seasonal KitKat flavor with messages of "good luck" to students studying for exams on each packet. The name "iyokan" is also a near-homophone for "good feeling" in Japanese, and is used as such in its marketing.

See also
 Amanatsu
 Jabara (citrus)
 Tangor
 Yuukou
 Yuzu

References

External links
 Nutrition facts

Citrus hybrids
Japanese fruit